A clear view screen or clearview screen is a glass disk mounted in a window that rotates to disperse rain, spray, and snow.  A clear view screen is typically driven by an electric motor at the center of the disk, and is often heated to prevent condensation or icing. Other common names for it include "clear sight", "spin window" and "rotating windshield wiper".

Clear view screens were patented in 1917 by Samuel Augustine de Normanville and Leslie Harcourt Kent as a stand-alone pillar-mounted screen, with later patents for telescope and optics covers, followed by the more familiar ships bridge glass. Clear view screens are also used in locomotives and rail transport, and were unsuccessfully marketed for automobiles. They were initially manufactured by George Kent Ltd, a firm began by Leslie Kent's grandfather, and of which Leslie Kent later was a director. The technology was then acquired by BAE Marine Works to produce clear view screens for military applications. BAE Marine Works was sold to Cornell-Carr Company in 2012 and exists as the sole provider of clear view screens in the continental US.

Significantly, the clarity of the Clearview can be observed firsthand in the storm scenes of the movie Ryan's Daughter, with the cinematography receiving an Academy Award and the camera needing to survive the dramatic storm weather that director David Lean had waited a year for.  The operation of the Clearview apparatus is prominently featured as the first photograph from a Cinephilia article  and a similar photograph of the Clearview device adorning the front cover of a David Lean biography.

See also
 Edgar de Normanville (1882–1968), often credited with the concept of clearing water from a windscreen by this method.

References 

Watercraft components
Windows